Isle Saint-Jean was a French colony in North America that existed from 1713 to 1763 on what is today Prince Edward Island.

History 

After 1713, France engaged in a reaffirmation of its territory in Acadia.  Besides the construction of Louisbourg on Cape Breton Island, France was resolved in organizing a colony on Isle Saint-Jean (present day Prince Edward Island).  The beginning of the colony was slow, only 297 inhabitants by 1728.  During the years 1740–1750, hundreds of Acadians fled Nova Scotia , which had been conquered by the British in 1713, to exile themselves on this island.  The colony went up to 4,000 inhabitants by 1755.
 
After Louisbourg had fallen to the British on July 26, 1758, during the French and Indian War, the order of deportation was given two weeks later to the Acadians of Isle Saint-Jean, and the Ile Saint-Jean Campaign began. The authorities had decided to forgo the initiative taken to assimilate them in the thirteen British colonies, and wanted them returned to France. Around 4,600 Acadiens lived on Isle Saint-Jean. In August 1758, 3,100 inhabitants were captured and deported to France. Others succeeded in hiding or fleeing. In all, 1,649 Acadians, around 53% of the total number deported, died from drowning or diseases.

In 1763, France ceded the Isle Saint-Jean officially to Great Britain, with the Treaty of Paris.

Notes and references

External links 
Carrefour de l'Isle-Saint-Jean

Acadian history
New France
Geography of Prince Edward Island
Pre-Confederation Prince Edward Island